Pallippuram Fort or (Paleport Castelo em Cima) is a fort in Pallippuram, Vyppin, Ernakulam district of Kerala, south India. It was built by Portuguese sailors on 27 September, 1503 using just timber wood, and later renovated in 1505 by replacing timber structure with stone. It is the oldest existing  European fort in India. The Dutch captured the fort in 1663 and sold it to the Kingdom of Travancore in 1789. The fort is situated in the northern extremity of Vypeen island and is hexagonal in shape, a form popularly known as ayikkotta or alikotta.

Structure
The gate and the door posts, and the lintels are finely dressed and arched while underground there is a cellar that was used to store gunpowder. A   well provided a source of fresh water.

There is an opening to the north which leads to the cellar. There is a circular slab stone, on which was installed a pillar on which the radiating wooden struts supporting the upper two floors must have rested.

Each face of the fort has three embrasures, one above the other. The central opening of the embrasures measures . The fort could have mounted as many as guns commanding all quarters round it. There is an open space inside affording easy passage to the cellar.

The fort is constructed using laterite, chunam, and wood. The walls are thickly plastered using mortar. The door way in the central circular slab is made of granite. All the six sides of the fort are overgrown with vegetation.

It has an underground path which connects to some other openings. It was saying that the route goes under rivers and lands which they used to escape from enemies when needed. The underground path is permanently closed now.

Gallery

References

External links

Cochin.org
Enchantingkerala.org
Pallippuram Fort on Flickr

Forts in Kerala
Portuguese forts in India
Colonial Kerala
Buildings and structures in Ernakulam district
Portuguese in Kerala
Infrastructure completed in 1503
1503 establishments in India
1500s establishments in Portuguese India
16th-century forts in India
1661 establishments in the Dutch Empire